Aappilattoq Heliport may refer to:
Aappilattoq Heliport (Kujalleq), IATA QUV, Heliport in Greenland
Aappilattoq Heliport (Avannaata), IATA AOQ, Heliport in Greenland